Uncle's Apartment, is a 1913 Russian short film directed by Pyotr Chardynin and Yevgeni Bauer.

Plot 

The film will tell about a man named Koko, who decides to rent out his uncle's apartment rooms, as a result of which, in the same apartment, absolutely different people turn out to be.

Starring 
 Dora Citorena
 Andrey Gromov
 Aleksandr Kheruvimov
 Ivan Mozzhukhin as Coco
 V. Niglov
 Lidiya Tridenskaya

References

External links 
 

1913 films
1910s Russian-language films
Russian black-and-white films
Russian silent short films
1913 short films
Films of the Russian Empire